Jaden Servania (born July 16, 2001) is a Puerto Rican footballer who plays for North Carolina FC in USL League One and the Puerto Rico national football team.

Career

Youth 
Servania moved from his native Alabama to join the FC Dallas academy in 2015, where he played before later moving again to Houston Dynamo in 2017.

Servania played with USL League Two side Brazos Valley Cavalry, an affiliate of Houston Dynamo, in 2019. He made his sole appearance for the club during a Lamar Hunt US Open Cup game against Laredo Heat on May 8, 2019.

Professional 
On February 6, 2020, Servania signed a USL Academy contract with USL Championship side Birmingham Legion, which would keep him eligible to play college soccer at a later time. He made his debut on July 15, 2020, starting in a 3–0 win over Memphis 901.

Servania signed with North Carolina FC of USL League One on January 21, 2022.

International 
Servania represented Puerto Rico U20's in the 2018 CONCACAF U-20 Championship, where he scored seven goals in just five appearances. He made his senior debut with the Puerto Rico national football team on January 19, 2021, in a friendly match against Dominican Republic.

Personal
Jaden is the brother of fellow professional soccer player Brandon Servania who currently plays for Toronto FC.

References

External links 
 Jaden Servania | uslchampionship.com USL Championship bio
 Jaden Servania Birmingham Legion bio

2001 births
Soccer players from Alabama
Puerto Rican footballers
Puerto Rico international footballers
American soccer players
American sportspeople of Puerto Rican descent
Association football midfielders
Birmingham Legion FC players
North Carolina FC players
Living people
USL Championship players
Brazos Valley Cavalry FC players